Jerome D. Fitzgerald (born April 22, 1941) is an American politician from the state of Iowa.

Fitzgerald was born in Webster County, Iowa and attended Iowa State University. He served in the Iowa House of Representatives from 1973 to 1979, as a Democrat. He also made an unsuccessful run for governor in 1978, losing to incumbent Robert D. Ray.

References

1941 births
Living people
Democratic Party members of the Iowa House of Representatives